Peetam Ram (26 January 1951 – 4 February 2022) was an Indian politician. He represented the Puranpur constituency of Uttar Pradesh and was a member of the Samajwadi Party.

Early life and education
Ram was born in Pilibhit District on 26 January 1951, to Jhajhan Lal. He attended Primary school and was literate. Ram belonged to the Scheduled caste community (Dhobi).

Political career
He was a Member of the Legislative Assembly of Uttar Pradesh (MLA) from 1996 to 2007 and again from 2012 till 2017.

Personal life and death
Ram was married to Sahodra Devi with whom he had a son and two daughters. He died from complications of COVID-19 at a hospital in Bareilly on 4 February 2022, aged 71.

See also
 Puranpur (Assembly constituency)
 Sixteenth Legislative Assembly of Uttar Pradesh
 Uttar Pradesh Legislative Assembly

References 

1951 births
2022 deaths
People from Pilibhit district
Samajwadi Party politicians
Uttar Pradesh MLAs 2012–2017
Deaths from the COVID-19 pandemic in India